The College Football All-America Team is an honor given annually to the best players of American college football at their respective positions. The original All-America team was the 1889 College Football All-America Team selected by Caspar Whitney and Walter Camp.  In 1950, the National Collegiate Athletic Bureau, which is the National Collegiate Athletic Association's (NCAA) service bureau, compiled the first list of All-Americans including first-team selections on teams created for a national audience that received national circulation with the intent of recognizing selections made from viewpoints that were nationwide.  Since 1952, College Sports Information Directors of America (CoSIDA) has bestowed Academic All-American recognition on male and female athletes in Divisions I, II, and III of the NCAA as well as National Association of Intercollegiate Athletics athletes, covering all NCAA championship sports.

The 2011 College Football All-America Team is composed of the following College Football All-American first teams: Associated Press (AP), Football Writers Association of America (FWAA), American Football Coaches Association (AFCA), Walter Camp Foundation (WCFF), The Sporting News (TSN), Sports Illustrated (SI), Pro Football Weekly (PFW), ESPN, CBS Sports (CBS), College Football News (CFN), Scout.com, and Yahoo! Sports (Yahoo!).

Currently, NCAA compiles consensus all-America teams in the sports of Division I-FBS football and Division I men’s basketball using a point system computed from All-America teams named by coaches associations or media sources. The system consists of three points for first team, two points for second team and one point for third team.  Honorable mention and fourth team or lower recognitions are not accorded any points.  Football consensus teams are compiled by position and the player accumulating the most points at each position is named first team consensus all-American.  Currently, the NCAA recognizes All-Americans selected by the AP, AFCA, FWAA, TSN, and the WCFF to determine Consensus All-Americans.

In 2011, there were 7 unanimous All-Americans.

Offense

Quarterback
Robert Griffin III, Baylor -- CONSENSUS -- (AP, FWAA, TSN, CBS, Scout.com, SI, Yahoo!)
Andrew Luck, Stanford (AFCA, WCFF, ESPN, PFW)

Running back
Montee Ball, Wisconsin -- CONSENSUS -- (AFCA, AP, FWAA, TSN, CBS, ESPN, Scout.com, SI, Yahoo!)
Ronnie Hillman, San Diego State (AP-3)
LaMichael James, Oregon (WCFF, AP-2)
Bobby Rainey, Western Kentucky (AP-3)
Trent Richardson, Alabama -- UNANIMOUS -- (AFCA, AP, FWAA, TSN, WCFF, CBS, ESPN, PFW, Scout.com, SI, Yahoo!)
David Wilson, Virginia Tech (AP-2)

Fullback
Jay Prosch, Illinois (PFW)

Wide receiver

Justin Blackmon, Oklahoma State -- UNANIMOUS -- (AFCA, AP, FWAA, TSN, WCFF, CBS, ESPN, Scout.com, SI, Yahoo!)
Ryan Broyles, Oklahoma -- CONSENSUS -- (FWAA, WCFF)
Sammy Watkins, Clemson (PFW, Yahoo!)
Jordan White, Western Michigan (AFCA)
Robert Woods, Southern California -- CONSENSUS -- (AP, TSN, ESPN, Scout.com, SI, Yahoo!)
Kendall Wright, Baylor (CBS, PFW)

Tight end
Dwayne Allen, Clemson -- CONSENSUS -- (AP, FWAA, ESPN, SI)
Orson Charles, Georgia (AFCA)
Tyler Eifert, Notre Dame (WCFF, Scout.com)
Coby Fleener, Stanford (TSN, CBS, PFW)

Tackle
Levy Adcock, Oklahoma State -- CONSENSUS -- (AFCA, FWAA, CBS, ESPN)
Barrett Jones, Alabama -- UNANIMOUS -- (AFCA, AP, FWAA, TSN, WCFF, CBS, ESPN, Scout.com, SI)
Matt Kalil, Southern California (AP, WCFF, PFW, SI, Yahoo!)
Jonathan Martin, Stanford (WCFF, Scout.com)
Kelechi Osemele, Iowa State (SI)
Nate Potter, Boise State -- CONSENSUS -- (FWAA, TSN, CBS, Yahoo!)
Riley Reiff, Iowa (PFW)

Guard
Will Blackwell, LSU (TSN, ESPN, Scout.com, Yahoo!)
David DeCastro, Stanford -- UNANIMOUS -- (AFCA, AP, FWAA, TSN, WCFF, CBS, ESPN, PFW, Scout.com, SI, Yahoo!)
Kevin Zeitler, Wisconsin -- CONSENSUS -- (AFCA, AP, PFW)

Center
Grant Garner, Oklahoma State (SI)
Ben Jones, Georgia (ESPN, Yahoo!)
Peter Konz, Wisconsin (AFCA, CBS, PFW)
David Molk, Michigan -- CONSENSUS --(AP, FWAA, TSN, WCFF, Scout.com)

Defense

End
Vinny Curry, Marshall (FWAA)
Melvin Ingram, South Carolina -- CONSENSUS --(AFCA, AP, TSN, WCFF, CBS, ESPN, PFW, SI, Yahoo!)
Whitney Mercilus, Illinois -- UNANIMOUS -- (AFCA, AP, FWAA, TSN, WCFF, CBS, ESPN, Scout.com, SI, Yahoo!)
Sam Montgomery, LSU (FWAA, PFW, Scout.com)
Alex Okafor, Texas (AFCA)

Tackle
Fletcher Cox, Mississippi State (PFW)
Brett Roy, Nevada (SI)
Devon Still, Penn State -- CONSENSUS -- (AP, FWAA, TSN, WCFF, CBS, ESPN, PFW, Scout.com, SI, Yahoo!)
Jerel Worthy, Michigan State -- CONSENSUS -- (AFCA, AP, TSN, WCFF, CBS, Scout.com, Yahoo!)

Linebacker
Lavonte David, Nebraska (AFCA, CBS, ESPN, Yahoo!)
Dont'a Hightower, Alabama -- CONSENSUS -- (AFCA, AP, WCFF, PFW, Yahoo!)
Jarvis Jones, Georgia -- CONSENSUS -- (AFCA, AP, FWAA, WCFF, ESPN, PFW, Scout.com, SI)
Luke Kuechly, Boston College -- CONSENSUS -- (AP, FWAA, TSN, WCFF, CBS, ESPN, Scout.com, SI, Yahoo!)
Chase Thomas, Stanford (TSN)
Courtney Upshaw, Alabama (FWAA, TSN, CBS, ESPN, PFW, Scout.com, SI)

Cornerback
David Amerson, North Carolina State (WCFF, ESPN)
Morris Claiborne, LSU -- UNANIMOUS -- (AFCA, AP, FWAA, TSN, WCFF, CBS, ESPN, PFW, Scout.com, SI, Yahoo!)
Dre Kirkpatrick, Alabama (FWAA, CBS, PFW)
Tyrann Mathieu, LSU -- CONSENSUS -- (AP, FWAA, TSN, WCFF, CBS, ESPN, Scout.com, SI, Yahoo!)
DeQuan Menzie, Alabama (AFCA)

Safety
Mark Barron, Alabama -- UNANIMOUS -- (AFCA, AP, FWAA, TSN, WCFF, CBS, ESPN, PFW, Scout.com, SI, Yahoo!)
Markelle Martin, Oklahoma State (AFCA, SI)
T. J. McDonald, Southern California (TSN, PFW)
Bacarri Rambo, Georgia (AP, Scout.com, Yahoo!)

Special teams

Kicker
Randy Bullock, Texas A&M -- CONSENSUS -- (AFCA, AP, TSN, WCFF, CBS, PFW, Scout.com, SI)
Brett Maher, Nebraska (Yahoo!)
Quinn Sharp, Oklahoma State (FWAA)
Caleb Sturgis, Florida (ESPN)

Punter
Ryan Allen, Louisiana Tech (TSN)
Steven Clark, Auburn (PFW)
Bobby Cowan, Idaho (FWAA)
Shawn Powell, Florida State -- CONSENSUS -- (AFCA, WCFF, ESPN, Yahoo!)
Brad Wing, LSU (AP, CBS, Scout.com, SI)

All-purpose / return specialist
Joe Adams, Arkansas -- CONSENSUS -- (FWAA, TSN, ESPN, PFW, Scout.com)
Tavon Austin, West Virginia (CBS)
LaMichael James, Oregon (AFCA)
Tyler Lockett, Kansas State (TSN, WCFF)
Tyrann Mathieu, LSU (CBS, SI, Yahoo!)
Greg McCoy, TCU (CBS, Yahoo!)
Sammy Watkins, Clemson (AP, Scout.com, SI)

See also
 2011 All-Big 12 Conference football team
 2011 All-Big Ten Conference football team
 2011 All-Pac-12 Conference football team
 2011 All-SEC football team

Notes

References
AFCA 2011 All-America team
Associated Press 2011 All-American Team
FWAA 2011 All-America team
Walter Camp Football Foundation 2011 All-America team
Sporting News' All-American team
CBS 2011 All-America team
ESPN 2011 All-America team
PFW 2011 All-America team
Scout.com 2011 All-America team
Sports Illustrated 2011 All-America team
Yahoo! Sports 2011 All-America Team

All-America Team
College Football All-America Teams